Centro Educativo Monteverde is a private school in Cancún, Mexico. It serves preschool through high school (preparatoria).

Cecilia Alcántara founded the school in the northern hemisphere summer of 1996. The first school building was constructed at Av. Kohunlich in Super Manzana 46 during the summer of 1997. Construction of the current campus on Av. Bonampak, Super Manzana 10B, began as of the 2001/2002 school year.

References

External links
 Centro Educativo Monteverde 

High schools in Mexico
Education in Quintana Roo
1996 establishments in Mexico
Educational institutions established in 1996